Tillamook High School is a four-year public high school located in Tillamook, Oregon, United States, as part of the Tillamook School District. The school has served the area for over 100 years. Its mascot is the Cheesemaker and its colors are red, black, and white.

History
Tillamook High School was established sometime prior to 1912.  The 1915 yearbook indicates alumni as far back as 1904. A new high school had been built for students in 1912. Students attended this school until the 1951–1952 school year, when they moved to the current location.

Academics
In 2008, 77% of the school's seniors received their high school diploma. Of 173 students, 133 graduated, 17 dropped out, 4 received a modified diploma, and 19 were still in high school the next year.

Athletics
The school's teams are known as the "Cheesemakers" after the local Tillamook Cheese Factory.

In 2007, Tillamook High School received a new turf football/soccer/track field.

Notable alumni
 Brian Boquist, politician
 Lars Larson, radio personality
 Jerry Kilgore, musician
 Jacob Young, actor, All My Children

References

High schools in Tillamook County, Oregon
Tillamook, Oregon
Public high schools in Oregon